Jean de Luxembourg or John of Luxembourg may refer to:

 John of Bohemia (1296-1346), King of Bohemia and Count of Luxembourg.
 John I, Lord of Ligny (1313-1364), Count of Ligny
 John of Luxembourg, Lord of Beauvoir (c. 1370 – 1397), Lord of Beauvoir 
 John II of Luxembourg, Count of Ligny (1392–1441)
 John of Luxembourg (died 1476), Count of Soissons
 Jean de Luxembourg (1400-1466), Admiral of Flanders
 John III, Count of Ligny (died 1576)
 Jean, Grand Duke of Luxembourg (1921-2019)
 Prince Jean of Luxembourg (born 1957)